Fred Rogers Fairchild (August 5, 1877 – April 13, 1966) was an American economist and educator.

Fairchild was born in Crete, Nebraska. His father was Arthur Babbitt Fairchild, a descendant of Thomas Fairchild, who settled in New England in 1639. He was a brother of Henry Pratt Fairchild, a sociologist and educator. Fairchild attended Doane College (AB, 1898) in Crete and Yale University (PhD, 1904). He also received an honorary LL.D. from Doane in 1929. Fairchild taught economics at Yale for many years.  He was a holder of the Knox Chair of Economics. He was published widely, and his work included well received textbooks.

Fairchild was an honorary member of the National Tax Association, an educational association of taxation experts. His primary field of study was federal taxation in the United States.  In a 1920 journal article published in the American Economic Review, Fairchild proposed a restructuring of the post-war U.S. federal taxation system in light of calls for the repeal of the excess profits tax enacted during wartime. He recommended, in order to ensure a "reasonable revenue to the government and justice to the various classes of taxpayers", that corporations be exempt from income taxes and instead that shareholder dividends become subject to the income tax.

Publications
 Understanding our Free Economy, with Thomas J. Shelley. D. Van Nostrand Company, Inc. 1962.
 Economics, MacMillan Company. 1948.
 Elementary Economics: Volume I, with Edgar Stevenson Furniss and Norman Sydney Buck. MacMillan Company. 1927
 Elementary Economics: Volume II, with Edgar Stevenson Furniss and Norman Sydney Buck. MacMillan Company. 1927.
 Essentials of Economics, American book Co. 1931.
 A description of the "New Deal", John Clifford Lecture. MacMillan Company. 1934.

References

External links
 Fred Rogers Fairchild papers (MS 202). Manuscripts and Archives, Yale University Library
 

American educators
Fred Rogers
1877 births
1966 deaths
People from Crete, Nebraska
Economists from Nebraska